Julianne, Julie or Julia Adams may refer to:

Julia Davis Adams (1900–1993), American author
Julie Adams (1926–2019), American actress, a/k/a Julia Adams
Julia Adams (sociologist) (born 1957), American sociologist
Julianne Adams (born 1966), Australian wheelchair basketball player
Julie Raque Adams (born 1969), American politician in Kentucky
Julie E. Adams (born 1977), American government official, Senate Secretary